Best Art Vinyl is an annual award that began in 2005. It celebrates artists and designers of vinyl record cover art. The nomination process begins in November and the winners are announced in January, and are exhibited at venues across the United Kingdom and Europe. The favourites are voted for by the public from a selection of nominations by judges within the world of art and music and are displayed using Art Vinyl's unique Play & Display Flip Frame.

2022 Winners

2021 Winners

2020 Winners

2019 Winners

2018 Winners

2017 Winners

2016 Winners

2015 Winners
 
Some of the information in this table was obtained from the following referenced article:

2014 Winners

2013 Winners

2012 Winners

2011 Winners

2010 Winners

2009 Winners

2008 Winners

2007 Winners

2006 Winners

2005 Winners

References

External links
 Best Art Vinyl nominations
 Art Vinyls Sleeves of 2008
 Best Vinyl Cover Art of 2009
 Muse’s ‘The Resistance’ Wins Best Art Vinyl

British music awards
Cover art awards